Sir James Winterwood is a fictional English traveller, adventurer and writer in the second half of the 19th century and a recurring character of the Brazilian writer Rita Maria Felix da Silva. He was introduced in the short story San Juan Romero.
In the stories, James travelled around the world collecting "curious facts" to use in his books. More frequently than he would like, these facts turned out to be supernatural.

During his adventures, James found the dark secret about a Mexican village; he was involved in the strange contend between Lord Douglas Whitehill and the bizarre Skykeeper and, by dreams, travelled to Earth's past and knew Mareish-Loh (the Spirit of Winter). At another moment, he had a dangerous meeting with the Egyptian mythological monster called "the Ammut". He was in Brazil (where he found out about the refuge of monsters and other supernatural beings called "Arena"), and in Portugal, when he involuntarily participated in Jose Fagundo de Solemar's plans, a sorcerer of Coimbra.

Four important features define James Winterwood:

1. A melancholic temperament (as result of James' tendency to try to "understand" the reality, more specifically the "evil in the world and in the human heart").

2. An extraordinary memory. Since he accumulated a plenty of painful memories during his life, James practiced memory-blockage, using a technique he learned from an African shaman.

3. A heart probably sapient that works as his conscience, "talking" to him and advising him. In the 21st century, Sam Winterwood, of who James was ancestor, had a heart like him.

4. His desire that his books can make his name immortal.

Other Winterwoods
Later, other short stories written by Rita Maria Felix da Silva showed James Winterwood as probable ancestor of the following characters:

1. Nora Winterwood (the fictional deceased writer, author of the book "Eight Minutes Under Water" in "O Tempo Apos"/Time After). Nora was Neil's niece and Jacob's cousin. She is cited by Jacob in the epilogue of "Khen-Zur".

2. Sam Winterwood (a depressed and suicidal man who finds he is immortal, in "Meu Segredo"/My Secret)

3. Neil Winterwood (the fictional author of "A Little Dictionary of the Hidden Things", a book about occultism, and "Quintessence", in which he ponders about the "universe's secret"), who is cited in "O Segredo de Chica"/Chica's Secret. A quote from Neil Winterwood is in "Comentário Sangüíneo" (Bloody Commentary). In this quote, Neil defines the term "bela arte noturna" (beautiful nocturne art), a reference to vampirical conditions/practices in opposition to human condition.

4. Jacob Winterwood (an English archeologist who worked for the speculator/supposed mystical objects collector/British gangster Lucius Whitehill. He is featured in "Khen-Zur" and was killed by Morgan H. Pierce, a Lucius's henchman). Jacob was Neil's nephew and Nora's cousin.

References

External links
 San Juan Romero published in Cidade Phantastica - text in Portuguese Language''

Fictional people from London